Golconda diamonds are mined in the Godavari delta region of the present-day states Andhra Pradesh and Telangana, India. Golconda Fort in the western part of modern-day Hyderabad, was a seat of the Golconda Sultanate and became an important centre for diamond enhancement, lapidary and trading. Golconda diamonds are graded as Type IIa, formed of pure carbon, are devoid of nitrogen, and are large with high clarity. They are often described as diamonds of the first water, making them among history's most celebrated diamonds. The word "Golconda diamond" became symbolic of diamonds of incomparable quality.

For 2,000 years Golconda diamonds were the only-known fine diamonds. Due to centuries of excessive mining, their production has been exhausted since 1830, and gemologists and traders have classified Golconda diamonds as antique, rare, and precious. Famous Golconda diamonds include the colourless Koh-i-Noor, the Nassak Diamond, the blue Hope Diamond, the Idol's Eye, the pink Daria-i-Noor, the white Regent, the Dresden Green, and the colourless Orlov, as well as now-untraceable diamonds such as the Florentine Yellow, the Akbar Shah, the Nizam, and the Great Mogul.

The Golconda diamond industry was at its peak in the 16th-to-18th centuries when 23 mines—of which Kollur Mine was the most active—operated in the region and 30,000 people worked at a time in one mine. After decades of disuse, the term "Golconda diamond" was repopularised in the 1950s in De Beers' advertising campaigns, for which Marilyn Monroe posed at a promotional event  wearing the Moon of Baroda (which is not a Golconda diamond). In 2015, Osmania University and Geological Survey of India, in a collaboration, discovered new potential sites for diamond mining in the region, though  mining has not started.

Several literary legends were inspired by Golconda diamonds; these include Sindbad the Sailor's valley of diamonds, the gem lore of Marco Polo, and the theme of Russell Conwell's inspirational lecture Acres of Diamonds. According to folklore, some Golconda diamonds are cursed; these impart good luck to their owners or possess mystical powers while others were worn as talismans. In 2013, the Princie Diamond from the Jewels of the Nizams was auctioned for 39.3 million—the highest-recorded auction price for Golconda Diamonds and the world record for 1.1 million per carat.

History 

Mediaeval records from Europe and the Middle East show India's importance as a source of high-quality diamonds. According to jewellery historian Jack Ogden, these records include those of Pliny the Elder, Marco Polo, Muhammed al-Idrisi and others from before the 12th century. The records state India produced diamonds with "which the gems were engraved". Ancient texts of Buddhists, Hindus, and Jains such as the Arthashastra (2nd century BCE – 4th century CE), the Ratna Pariksha, and the Puranas refer to cities and regions of India that produced diamonds. Roman historian Pliny the Elder (23-79 CE) describes in his encyclopedia the demand and fondness of Roman imperial ladies for the diamonds of South India. The tales of Sinbad the Sailor's voyages, which were written during the reign of the Abbasid Caliph Harun al-Rashid (786–809 CE), describes the Valley of the Diamonds that is featured in the book One Thousand and One Nights (Arabian Nights, Alf Laila Wa Laila, or Alif Laila). These regional descriptions have the same features of Deccan in general and the Golconda region in particular. These names are difficult to link to modern geographic names.

Until the 17th century, mines in this region were the only source of diamonds on earth. According to the records of 18th-and-19th-century geologists, researchers, and traders, the region south of the Kurnool district near Krishna river valley in and around NTR district, Palnadu, and Guntur; the Godavari delta in Rampachodavaram and Bhadrachalam; north-eastern Madhya Pradesh; eastern Chhattisgarh; western Jharkhand; and north-western Odisha are possible historical sources of diamond in India. The best-known region among these was historically known as Telingana or Tilling, and was renamed Golconda during the Deccan sultanates period and generally known as the Godavari delta. As European travellers and traders increasingly engaged in trading with producers of this region, the region's diamonds came to be referred to as "Golconda diamonds".

Mining 

The peak period of the Golconda diamond mining was the 16th-to-18th centuries under the Golconda Sultanate and the Nizams of Hyderabad. The mines were leased under the supervision of regional governors, of whom 17th-century prominent diamond trader Mir Jumla became the Grand vizier (Prime Minister) of the Golconda Sultanate. He established a network of diamond merchants in Europe, Africa, the Middle East, and Asia up to China and the Malay Archipelago. Shantidas Jhaveri was also a diamond trader of the 17th century.

Golconda diamonds were mined from alluvial soil settings alongside river beds. When mining reached ground water, digging was halted. Stony substances were then collected for assortment and examined for diamonds. Raw diamonds from the mines were typically transported to Golconda—now the western part of Hyderabad—) for skilled lapidary, enhancement, and further evaluation and sale. The art of macle, which is a form of rough diamond used to produce jewellery, was first developed in the Golconda region. Of the 38 diamond mines in India at the time, 23 were located in the Golconda Sultanate, of which the Kollur Mine was prominent and employed 60,000 workers at once. Most of these mines were fully active until 1830 but were gradually abandoned as they became either submerged by the backwaters or depleted due to excessive mining. Thus, mining gradually declined and finally officially closed.

In 2015, the Centre of Exploration Geophysics (Osmania University) and the Geological Survey of India conducted research that identified three zones that contain 21 potential new diamond-mining sites near the delta of the Krishna and Bhima rivers, in the riverbeds of the Krishna, Tungabhadra, and Penna rivers. According to the research, the sites contain volcanic pipes that probably bear Kimberlite and possibly diamonds.

Trading 
The Golconda region was a major trading centre and the source of the world's most-famous diamonds. Until the end of the 19th century, it was the primary source of the finest and largest diamonds in the world, making the name "Golconda diamond" synonymous with diamonds of good quality. It has been estimated the Golconda region had traded around 10 million carats of diamonds. A unit of measurement for Golconda diamonds was the Ratti (⅞ of a carat), and the most-common currency was Golconda Pagoda (also called Hun)— equivalent to five-and-a-half Mughal Rupee, and eight French livres,  though the contemporary gold coins with slight variation in weight such as the Hun, Rial, and Dinar were also used.

Golconda had been trading diamonds with European kingdoms since at earliest the days of Marco Polo (1254–1324). During the 1420s, Niccolò de' Conti, a prominent Italian traveller and merchant who lived in India, had a detailed account of diamond valleys in the Golconda region. The 15th-century Portuguese discovery of the sea route to India and 16th-century Golconda Sultanate's new port at Machilipatnam increased the production and trade of Golconda diamonds. The emergence of demand for Golconda diamonds led to the new exploration and discoveries of fertile mines in the region that produce brilliant diamonds.
 
In the 1600s, under the Golconda Sultanate, when new mines were discovered and leased to the miners, an agreement called "Qaul" would be signed under the supervision of regional governors, according to which, for employing 100 workers the miners would pay four Pagodas per day, and monthly rent was based on the strength of the workers on the mining site. Provisions were supplied only by the governor with 50 percent extra excise duty, and large diamonds from the site were exclusively reserved for the rulers and to be sold with concessions. Bania and Khatri (merchant and trading communities in India) held most of mines, and in the early 1600s, some Dutch miners of the  Dutch East India Company were granted mining rights. The 17th-century French explorer Jean-Baptiste Tavernier reported he was "permitted to examine" the egg-shaped Great Moghul diamond, which is now lost and said to have been cut into smaller diamonds. He reported having seen a flat diamond called the Great Table diamond in Golconda. Jean de Thévenot and François Bernier were also French traders in Golconda diamonds.

In 1621 and 1622, when the Golconda rulers learned about the demand for Golconda diamonds in Europe, they seized all of the mines and temporarily halted mining to increase the price, which then doubled. In 1627, high prices led Dutch traders to stop purchasing, and the British East India Company brought investments and purchased the diamonds, and their monopoly continued along with indigenous traders such as Mir Jumla II, Virji Vora, and Kasi Veranna until the mines became depleted in the 1830s. In the early 1900s, private companies such as Cartier, De Beers, and Van Cleef & Arpels created monopolies in their expertise in the jewellery trade following World War II and Indian Independence. Most of the impoverished governments and princely rulers came to an end, forcing them sell their jewels—including Golconda diamonds—which were later auctioned. Due to their royal lineage, mystical tales and advertising campaigns by these companies, Golconda diamonds became the global status reference.

Popularity 

Historically, diamonds of high quality were mined from the Golconda region and were reserved for the emperors and rulers. Sometimes diamonds were considered to have supernatural powers and were worn as amulets and talismans. The Shah Jahan Diamond, which is currently part of Al Saba Collection, was once an amulet of the Mughal emperors. They were treasured as gemstones, believed to be a gift from God for mankind, and owning them was a sign of supremacy. Golconda diamonds were popularized in the Middle East and the Western world by mediaeval and modern-period travellers and traders such as Niccolò de' Conti, Muhammad al-Idrisi, Marco Polo, and Jean-Baptiste Tavernier. Diamonds from India—most of which were Golconda diamonds—were used to decorate the crowns and sceptres of European rulers; it was considered a point of pride by any ruler to own a Golconda diamond. The Industrial Revolution in the 19th century brought growth to the world economy, and the introduction of sophisticated cutting and polishing techniques led to a higher worldwide demand for diamonds. The popularity of Golconda diamonds has risen since the 1950s because of successful advertising campaigns by traders. They continue to be a popular gemstone in the 21st century.

Physical properties 

Golconda diamonds are the world's most magnificent diamonds. They are formed of pure carbon and have no nitrogen, and stand high on grading standards, giving them the rare Type IIa designation—(Type IIa count less than two percent of the world's natural diamonds.). They are large and naturally occur in many colours but most of them are known for their colourless clarity and material properties, and some are popular for their colours, for which they are characterised as Diamonds of First water.

Notable diamonds 

Although Golconda diamonds are known for their size and clarity, the diamond mines of the Golconda region are now depleted and inactive. Later discoveries of diamond deposits in regions such as Brazil post-1730, Australia post-1851, and Africa post-1866 provided significant supplies of diamonds, even though their clarity generally do not match that of Golconda diamonds. For these reasons, Golconda diamonds remain among the world's most-celebrated diamonds.

Some of the notable Golconda diamonds are:
The Daria-i-Noor is part of the Iranian Crown Jewels collection of the Central Bank of Iran in Tehran;
The Nizam Diamond went missing from Hyderabad after a police action in 1948;
The Great Mogul Diamond and the Orlov Diamond are part of the Diamond Fund collection of Moscow's Kremlin Armoury;
The Koh-i-Noor is part of the Crown Jewels in the Jewel House at the Tower of London;
The Hope Diamond is housed in the National Gem and Mineral Collection at the National Museum of Natural History in Washington, D.C.;
The Regent Diamond passed through French monarchs Charles X and the Napoleon Bonaparte to the Government of France, and is now part of the French Crown Jewels on display in the Louvre, Paris];
The Idols Eye Diamond was stolen by a servant of Ottoman Sultan Abdul Hamid II while he was in exile in Paris, where it was sold to an unknown Spanish aristocrat; 
The Florentine Yellow was owned by Grand Duke Ferdinand I; it later became part of Austrian Crown Jewels and is now untraceable;
The Akbar Shah was engraved with the names of the Mughal emperors Akbar, Jahangir and Shah Jahan, and was later mounted on the Peacock Throne. After Persian ruler Nader Shah lost it, the diamond appeared in Turkey for sale and was purchased by a British company that later reshaped it and sold it to the Indian Prince of Baroda Malhar Rao Gaekwad. The current possessor of the diamond is unknown.

The top-four pink diamonds of the world are from Golconda. Cardinal Mazarin was an influential Chief minister of France during the reign of Louis XIII and Louis XIV; Mazarin, a connoisseur of jewels, sponsored Jean Baptiste Tavernier's journey to India to collect diamonds; among his collection is the 19.07-carat light-pink Le Grand Mazarin Diamond, which he always kept close to him. In his will, Mazarin bequeathed it to decorate the French crown; all of the French rulers from Louis XIV to Napoleon III have worn it. After France's defeat in the Franco-Prussian War (1870), the diamond was sold along with other French Crown Jewels to settle the losses. Frederic Boucheron a jewellery-house owner, purchased it and sold it to Cartier Jeweller.

Popular culture 

While travelling in the Middle East in 1869, Russell Conwell, a lawyer and educator who founded Temple University in Philadelphia, met an Arab bedouin who told him a story in which "beneath Ali Hafed's farm sat the great mines and diamonds of Golconda". Intrigued by the tale, Conwell prepared his inspirational lecture Acres of Diamonds.
 In 1953, actor Marilyn Monroe posed wearing the Moon of Baroda to promote her movie Gentlemen Prefer Blondes in which she performs the song Diamonds Are a Girl's Best Friend. The song became a household phrase and popularized the diamond—particularly on an engagement ring—as a symbol of romance and love. A photograph of Monroe wearing Moon of Baroda was part of De Beers marketing campaign the started in 1947 with the slogan “a diamond is forever”.
 In 1959, the Krupp Diamond ring was stolen from German actor Vera Krupp (1909–1967) in a robbery at her house. The diamond was recovered after the Federal Bureau of Investigation (FBI) became involved. In 1968, it came in the possession of Elizabeth Taylor, who renamed it the "Elizabeth Taylor Diamond". Taylor was fond of jewellery and owned a collection of gems and jewellery; she also published a book about her collection; My Love Affair with Jewelry in 2002.
 The Heart of the Ocean, a blue diamond necklace in the 1997 film Titanic, was designed by London-based jewellers Asprey & Garrard, who took inspiration from three diamonds of the French Crown Jewels known as The Regent, the Marie Antoinette Blue, and the Hope Diamond.
 The pink, cushion-cut, 34.65-carat Princie Diamond used to be part of the Jewels of the Nizams of Hyderabad; it was auctioned in 2013 by Christie's and sold for 39.3 million, which is the highest-recorded auction price for Golconda diamond and a world record for 1.1 million per carat.
 On 28 July 2014, Animal Planet presented an episode called “The Golconda Curse" in the series Lost treasure hunters Season I.
 The Cartier Toussaint Necklace in the 2018 film Ocean's 8 was inspired by the necklace of Ranjitsinhji, ruler of Nawanagar State in India. The main attraction of the necklace is its centrepiece  Queen of Holland Diamond, whose place of origin is unknown but based on its characteristics, gemologists placed it among the Golconda diamonds.

Legends 

According to a popular legend, the Koh-i-Noor should only be possessed by a female and will bring bad luck to a male. Alauddin Khalji, who obtained it from the Kakatiya dynasty, was murdered by his slave. Nader Shah, who looted the Koh-i-Noor from the Mughals and gave it its current name, was assassinated. Shuja Shah Durrani was overthrown by his predecessor and went into exile. Ranjit Singh died of a heart attack and when the diamond passed to the East India Company, it was passed on to Queen Victoria, after which it was successively mounted in the crowns of Queen Alexandra, Queen Mary and Queen Elizabeth the Queen Mother. The latter crown is on public display along with the other Crown Jewels in the Jewel House at the Tower of London.

Accounts of ill fortune and curses are also associated with the Hope Diamond; Tavernier, who took the stone to Paris, was "torn to pieces by wild dogs" in Constantinople. Louis XIV gave it to Madame de Montespan, whom later he abandoned. Sultan Hamid of Turkey gave it to Abu Sabir to "polish" but Sabir was later imprisoned and tortured. An article entitled "Hope Diamond Has Brought Trouble To All Who Have Owned It" appeared in The Washington Post in 1908.

According to legend, the Regent Diamond was discovered between 1698 and 1701 at Kollur Mine. A slave worker who found the diamond smuggled it out by hiding it deep inside a self-inflicted cut. The slave wanted to escape from India with the diamond so he contacted the captain of a British ship. The slave and the captain agreed to share equally in the proceeds from the diamond's sale in exchange for safe passage. Later, the captain stole the diamond, killed the slave, and sold the diamond to an Indian merchant named Jamchand. Jamchand allegedly sold it to Thomas Pitt, who in turn sold it to Philippe d’Orléans.

According to pervasive folklore narrated by Marco Polo about his 13th-century visits to the Golconda region, the diamond valley was replete with venomous snakes, making it dangerous to obtain the diamonds. The diamond traders took a herd of cattle to the hilltop near the valley. After slaughtering the cattle, the cow flesh was catapulted towards the diamond valley and became stuck to the precious stones, which were picked by eagles and vultures that carried the conglomeration to their nests to feed. The stones remained after the birds consumed the flesh, allowing the stones to be tracked and collected by the local merchants' workers. According to Jean R. Brink, who wrote Renaissance Culture in Context: Theory and Practice (2017), this legend is repeated in many mediaeval Arabic and Chinese literary works. It was also repeated by Marco Polo, who visited the region's capital Warangal but did not visit the mining sites.

Controversies, scandals and heists 

Being the world's most-famous, large, and valuable stones with interesting histories, the Golconda diamonds attract envy and fascination, for which many controversies, heists, larceny, and scandals have occurred. The affair of the Diamond Necklace (1784–1786) was about a 2,800-carat necklace containing 647 gems. The incident brought ignominy to Queen Marie Antoinette and later instigated the French Revolution. In 1792, the French Crown Jewels were stolen from the Garde Meuble (Royal Treasury); although most of the jewels were tracked, the thieves sold the Sancy and Regent Diamonds, and the Royal French Blue Diamond was cut and renamed the Hope Diamond. The thief returned the Mazarin Diamond in exchange for a pardon and the diamond was restored to the French crown. In 1811, Napoleon Bonaparte gifted his wife Marie Louise the Napoleon Diamond Necklace, which became a sensation during the Great Depression (1929) when Archduke Leopold of Austria was imprisoned on larceny charges connected with the necklace sale.

In 1980, a heist was executed at Sydney Town Hall to steal the 95-carat yellow Golconda d'or diamond from an exhibition display. In 2019, the Al Thani Collection of Qatar faced a trial after purchasing the Princie Diamond in an auction without its heir's consent. The matter was settled out of court. In the same year, jewels worth 1.2 billion were stolen in a heist from the Green Vault in Dresden Castle, Germany; along with other treasures, the 49-carat rose cut Dresden White Diamond was stolen. The diamond belonged to 18th-century ruler Frederick Augustus I of Saxony.

In 2018, diamond trader Nirav Modi was charged by Interpol for  2 billion fraud case. He entered the limelight when he started his career by selling a pear-shaped 12.29 carat Golconda diamond necklace at auction at Hong Kong.  One of the most expensive and sensational theft occurred on 25 November 2019 at the Green Vault in Dresden Castle, Germany. Jewels worth  1.2 billion were stolen—including a 49-carat rose cut Dresden White Diamond (a Golconda diamond worth 9–10 million) surrounded by 230 individual diamonds made into an epaulette during the Seven Years' War of 1756 AD. The diamond belonged to the 18th-century ruler Frederick Augustus I of Saxony.

See also 
 List of diamonds
 List of largest rough diamonds

Explanatory notes

References

External links 

 Diamond ranking
 History of Koh-i-noor
 Not just the Koh-i-noor: Eight precious diamonds of Golconda which India lost
 Gem-stones and their distinctive characters
 Video history of the Golconda diamonds
 The untold truth of the crown jewels of the United Kingdom

Further reading 
 The Great Diamonds of the World, Their History and Romance, 1882, Edwin Streeter
 Romance of the Golconda Diamonds, 1999, Omar Khalidi
 Koh-i-Noor: Six myths about a priceless diamond, 2016, BBC
 The Koh-i-noor Diamond, 2013, Iradj Amin
 Colored Diamonds, 2006, John M. King
 Some folklore and history of Diamond, 1961, S. Tolansky

Diamonds originating in India
Jewels of the Nizams of Hyderabad